Danubyu is a town in the Ayeyarwady Division of south-west Myanmar, located on the west bank of the Ayeyarwaddy River in the Ayeyarwaddy Delta. It is the seat of the Danubyu Township in the Maubin District.

History
After the loss to the British in the Battle of Yangon during the First Anglo-Burmese War, Maha Bandula retreated to Danubyu. He quickly built a fort using local trees and built up a strong stockade with 10,000 troops. When the British arrived in early 1825, they started a siege but was unable to break through Bandula's defences after a few months despite their superior weaponry. During the Battle of Danubyu, Bandula defended against the first attack but lost after a failed counter-charge with elephants. Bandula was killed in Danubyu by a mortar shell while walking around in the open against the warning of his generals in an attempt to boost morale.

Economy
As the area around Danubyu is fertile and nutrient-rich, agriculture is the town's main industry. Major crops include rice and Matpe beans. Danubyu also has produces tobacco as well as traditional carpet-weaving.

References

Township capitals of Myanmar
Populated places in Ayeyarwady Region